Alania was a medieval kingdom of the Iranian Alans (proto-Ossetians) that flourished in the Northern Caucasus, roughly in the location of latter-day Circassia, Chechnya, Ingushetia, and modern North Ossetia–Alania, from its independence from the Khazars in the late 9th century until its destruction by the Mongol invasion in 1238–39. Its capital was Maghas, and it controlled a vital trade route through the Darial Pass. The kingdom reached its peak in the 11th century, under the rule of king Durgulel.

Name 
The name Alania derives from the Old Iranian stem *Aryāna-, a derivative form of the Indo-Iranian stem *arya- ('Aryan'). It is cognate with the name of Iran (Ērān), which stems from the Old Persian *Aryānām ('of the Aryans').

History 

The Alans (Alani) originated as an Iranian-speaking subdivision of the Sarmatians. They were split by the invasion of the Huns into two parts, the European and the Caucasian. The Caucasian Alans occupied part of the North Caucasian plain and the foothills of the main mountain chain from the headwaters of the Kuban River in the west to the Darial Gorge in the east.

As vassal of Khazaria
Alania was an important buffer state during the Byzantine-Arab Wars and Khazar-Arab Wars of the 8th century. Theophanes the Confessor left a detailed account of Leo the Isaurian's mission to Alania in the early 8th century. Leo was instructed by Emperor Justinian II to bribe the Alan leader Itaxes into severing his "ancient friendship" with the Kingdom of Abkhazia which had allied itself with Caliph Al-Walid I. He crossed the mountain passes and concluded an alliance with the Alans, but was prevented from returning to Byzantium through Abasgia. Although the Abkhazians spared no expense to have him imprisoned, the Alans refused to convey the Byzantine envoy to his enemies. After several months of adventures in the Northern Caucasus, Leo extricated himself from the precarious situation and returned to Constantinople.

After Leo assumed the imperial title, the land of his mountaineer allies was invaded by Umar II's forces. A Khazar chieftain, Barjik, hastened to their succor and, in 722, the joint Alan-Khazar army inflicted a defeat on the Arab general Tabit al-Nahrani. The Khazars erected Skhimar and several other strongholds in Alania at this period. In 728 Maslamah ibn Abd al-Malik, having penetrated the Gate of the Alans, devastated the country of the Alans. Eight years later, Marwan ibn Muhammad passed by the Gate in order to ravage the forts in Alania. In 758, as Ibn al-Faqih reports, the Gate was held by another Arab general, Yazid ibn Usayd.

As a result of their united stand against the successive waves of invaders from the south, the Alans of the Caucasus fell under the overlordship of the Khazar Khaganate. They remained staunch allies of the Khazars in the 9th century, supporting them against a Byzantine-led coalition during the reign of the Khazar king Benjamin. According to the anonymous author of the Schechter Letter, many Alans were during this period adherents of Judaism.

Independence and Christianization

In the late 9th century, Alania became independent from the Khazars. In the early 10th century, the Alans fell under the influence of the Byzantine Empire due to King Constantine III of Abkhazia's activities in north Caucasus. He sent an army into Alan territory and, with the Byzantine patriarch Nicholas Mystikos, converted the Alans to Christianity. The conversion is documented in the letters of Patriarch Nicholas Mysticus to the local archbishop, Peter, who was appointed here through King George II of Abkhazia's efforts. Richard Foltz has suggested that only certain elite Alan families were Christianized, the bulk of the population continuing to follow their original pagan traditions.

When Ibn Rustah visited Alania at some point between 903 and 913, its king was by then Christian.  The Persian traveller came to Alania from Sarir, a Christian kingdom immediately to the east:

Later history 

After the downfall of Khazaria, the Alan kings frequently allied with the Byzantines and various Georgian rulers for protection against encroachments by northern steppe peoples such as the Pechenegs and Kipchaks. John Skylitzes reports that Alda of Alania, after the death of her husband, "George of Abasgia" (i.e., George I of Georgia), received Anakopia as a maritime fief from Emperor Romanus III. This happened in 1033, the year when the Alans and the Rus sacked the coast of Shirvan in modern-day Azerbaijan. Alania is not mentioned in East Slavic chronicles, but archaeology indicates that the Alans maintained trade contacts with the Rus' principality of Tmutarakan. There is a stone grave cross, with a Cyrillic inscription from 1041, standing on the bank of the Bolshoi Yegorlyk River in present-day Stavropol Krai, immediately north of Alania. Two Russian crosses, datable to ca. 1200, were discovered by archaeologists in Arkhyz, the heartland of medieval Alania.

The Alans and Georgians probably collaborated in the Christianization of the Vainakhs and Dvals in the 12th and 13th centuries, Georgian missionaries were active in Alania and the Alan contingents were frequently employed by the Georgian monarchs against their Muslim neighbors. The Alanian-Georgian alliance was cemented in the 1060s, when the Alans struck across Muslim Arran and sacked Ganja. In the 1120s King David the Builder of Georgia visited the Darial to reconcile the Alans with the Kipchaks, who thereupon were allowed to pass through Alania to the Georgian soil. David's son, Demetre I, also journeyed, c. 1153, to Alania accompanied by the Arab historian Ibn al-Azraq. The alliance culminated in 1187, when the Alanian prince David Soslan married Queen Tamar of Georgia, a half-Alanian herself, with their descendants ruling Georgia until the 19th century. The medieval Alanian princesses also married Byzantine and Russian Rurikid rulers more than once. For instance, Maria the Ossetian, who founded the Convent of Princesses in Vladimir, was the wife of Vsevolod the Big Nest and grandmother of Alexander Nevsky.

In the late 1230s all three Christian powers - Alania, Georgia, and Vladimir-Suzdal - fell before the Mongol invaders. Bishop Theodore of Alania described the plight of his metropolis in a lengthy epistolary sermon written during the tenure of Patriarch Germanus II (1222–40). The French-Flemish monk and traveler William of Rubruck mentions Alans numerous times in the account of his 1253–1255 journey through Eurasia to the Great Khan, e.g. Alans living as Mongol subjects in Crimea, Old Astrakhan, the Khan's capital Karakoram, and also still as freemen in their Caucasian homeland ("the Alans or Aas, who are Christians and still fight the Tartars").

The wars of Timur in the 14th century inflicted the final blow on Alania and decimated its population. Those who survived being killed or enslaved by the Mongols and Timur's armies, broke up into three groups. One retreated into the foothills and valleys of the central Caucasus and produced the two principal Ossetian groups, Digor and Iron.  Another group of Alans migrated with the Kipchaks into Eastern Europe and preserved their language and ethnic identity as the Jassic people until the 15th century. The third group joined the Mongol horde and soon disappeared from history.

Known rulers 

The nomenclature used by the rulers of Alania is unknown. Where they are mentioned by historical records, they are variously called "lord", "prince", "king", "tsar", and by the Byzantines, exousiokrator. Notably, the Byzantines never referred to other foreign rulers by this title, using arkhon or exousiastes instead.

Non-dynastic/dynasty unknown 
 Bazuk - c. late 1st/early 2nd century; allied with the Arsacid kings of Iberia
 Anbazuk/Ambazuk - co-ruled with previous
 Ashkhadar - c. early 4th century; father of Ashkhen, wife of Trdat III of Armenia
 Itaz - waged war against Abkhazia in the early 8th century

Tsarazon/Tsærasantæ dynasty 
 Urdur/Urdura/Urdure - c. early 11th century; first known ruler of Alania after independence from the Khazars. He invaded Kakheti around 1029 and died in battle against Kvirike III. According to Vakhushti of Kartli, Kvirike was assassinated by an Alan slave in revenge.
 Durgulel the Great - c. 11th century; son of previous, father or brother of Alda of Alania and Borena of Alania. Byzantine seals refer to him as Gabriel, which may represent a baptismal name. Sometimes considered to be identical with his predecessor.
 Rosmik - c. early 12th century; fought with the Byzantines against the Normans invading Epirus c. 1107/8
 Khuddan - c. 12th century; father of Burdukhan of Alania, wife of George III of Georgia

Bagrationi dynasty 
 David - c. 12th century; grandson of Alda of Alania; forced to flee Georgia after his father Demetrius unsuccessfully tried to claim the throne. He and his descendants married into the Tsarazon dynasty and became the rulers of Alania
 Aton - son of previous
 Jadaron - son of previous
 David Soslan - d. 1207; son of previous, married Tamar of Georgia

Sado-Orsoy dynasty 

 Khasi I - King of Alania (1207?-1241) and Durdzuketi (late 1190s-1241), participant in the Mongol invasions of Durdzuketi 
 Khour I, son of the previous, king of the Alans and Durdzuks (1241-1252), leader of the insurgency in Durdzuketi
 Chakhig, son of the previous, king of the Alans and Durdzuks (1253-1278) leader of the Dedyakov rebellion
 Khasi II, son of the previous, king of the Alans and Durdzuks (1278-?)

Non-dynastic/dynasty unknown 
 Kachir-Ukule/Kachiruk Ulu (Kachiruk the Senior? Compare with David Ulu) - c. 1237 - last known ruler of the united Alan kingdom. Captured and killed by the Mongols.
 Indiabu - c. 13th century
 Peredjan - c. 1290

Legacy 
In the last years of the Soviet Union, as nationalist movements swept throughout the Caucasus, many intellectuals in the North Ossetian ASSR called for the revival of the name "Alania". A leading Ossetian philologist T. A. Guriev was the main advocate of this idea, insisting that the Ossetians should accept the name of the Alans as their self-designation and rename North Ossetia into Alania. The term "Alania" quickly became popular in Ossetian daily life through the names of various enterprises, a TV channel, political and civic organizations, a publishing house, a soccer team, an airline company, etc. In November 1994, the name of "Alania" was officially added to the republican title (Republic of North Ossetia–Alania).

References

Sources

Kuznetsov V. A. Ocherki istorii alan. Vladikavkaz, 1992.

Pletneva, Svetlana. Ot kochevii k gorodam. Moscow, 1967.
 

Former countries in Europe
History of the North Caucasus